The Audie Award for Short Stories or Collections is one of the Audie Awards presented annually by the Audio Publishers Association (APA). It awards excellence in narration, production, and content for an audiobook collection of short stories released in a given year. From 2000 to 2001 it was given as the Audie Award for Short Stories, Essays, or Collections. It has been awarded since 2000.

Winners and finalists

2000s

2010s

2020s

References

External links 

 Audie Award winners
 Audie Awards official website

Short Stories or Collection
English-language literary awards
Awards established in 2000